The 14th Smule Mirchi Music Awards or Mirchi Music Awards 2022 or MMA 14 is the 14th edition of the Mirchi Music Awards, held on 19 March 2022 at Yash Raj Studios to honour the best Indian music of 2020 and 2021, and broadcast on 27 March 2022 on Colors TV and digitally on JioTV, JioCinema and Voot.

Awards 
The winners and nominees are listed below. Winners are listed first, highlighted in boldface, and indicated with a double dagger.

Main Awards

Upcoming Awards

Listeners' Choice Awards

Technical Awards

Special Jury Awards

Jury
Source – Mirchi Music Awards

Screening Jury

 1. Shruti Pathak
 2. Abhishek Ray
 3. Anand Sharma
 4. Akbar Sami
 5. Bishwadeep Chatterjee
 6. Dominique
 7. Nandini
 8. Kavita Seth
 9. Shibani Kashyap
 10. Priya Sarayia
 11. Hamsika Iyer
 12. Aaman Trikha
 13. Manoj Muntashir
 14. Mayur Puri
 15. Bipin Aneja
 16. Brayan
 17. Shadab Faridi
 18. Brijesh Sandiliyar
 19. Antara Mitra
 20. Jeetu Shankar
 21. Bhoomi Trivedi
 22. Paroma Das Gupta
 23. Divya Kumar

Grand Jury

 1. Kavita Krishnamurthy
 2. Ila Arun
 3. Vidya Shah
 4. Ramesh Sippy
 5. Sudhir Mishra
 6. Dharmesh Darshan
 7. Ahmed Khan
 8. Suresh Wadkar
 9. Sharvan Rathod (of Nadeem-Shravan)
 10. Millind Srivastava (of Anand–Milind)
 11. Pritam
 12. Louiz Banks
 13. Lalit Pandit
 14. Raju Singh
 15. Sameer Anjaan (lyricist)
 16. Irshad Kamil
 17. Talat Aziz
 18. Roop Kumar Rathod
 19. Udit Narayan
 20. Pandit Sujit Ojha
 21. Vijay Dayal
 22. Himesh Reshammiya

Superlatives

References

External links 
 Mirchi Music Awards (2022) at the Internet Movie Database

Mirchi Music Awards